Richard Anthony Lancellotti (born July 5, 1956) is a former first baseman-outfielder in Major League Baseball who played for the San Diego Padres, San Francisco Giants and Boston Red Sox. He batted and threw left-handed.

Lancellotti moved frequently in his youth, leaving Concord, New Hampshire, for Cherry Hill, New Jersey, as a teenager and transferred to Cherry Hill High School East in his junior year where he made the baseball team as a pitcher.

A gifted slugger who led four different leagues in home runs, Lancellotti received only limited opportunities on the Major League level to showcase the power he displayed in the minor leagues. A perennial minor-league All-Star, he played in 15 different leagues and several countries, including stints in Canada, Colombia, Italy, Japan, Mexico and Venezuela.

In 1979, Lancellotti was named the Eastern League most valuable player after he led the league with 41 home runs and 107 runs batted in while playing for the Buffalo Bisons, the Double-A affiliate of the Pittsburgh Pirates. On August 5, 1980, Lancellotti, along with Luis Salazar, was traded to the San Diego Padres for a player to be named later and Kurt Bevacqua. The Padres later sent Mark Lee to Pittsburgh to complete the trade.

In , Lancellotti led the Pacific Coast League with 31 home runs while playing for Phoenix, at the time the Giants' Triple-A affiliate. At 30, he was promoted to the big club and hit .222 with two home runs and six RBI in 18 at-bats. In  and  he played in Japan, hitting 58 home runs in 190 games for Hiroshima, including a league-leading 39 homers in 1987. Two years later he played in the now defunct Senior Professional Baseball Association.

Lancellotti did not win another chance in the majors until August 1990, when he played four games for the Boston Red Sox and went 0-for-8. Lancellotti was a major player in the Red Sox famous Rally Cap game where several teammates used cups on their ears, hats on catcher-style, and shave cream on their faces. Dwight Evans homered to turn the game around during this comedic mêlée. Before the promotion he had 10 home runs for Triple-A Pawtucket. He returned just in time to finish the month with 11 home runs to win the International League title with 21. Lancellotti was named the best player in the Red Sox farm system by the Boston Sportswriters Association. At the same time, Boston released him. In , he played for the Parma Angels of Italy, being named the Best Hitter during the European Cup held in the Netherlands. He retired after the season and settled in Buffalo, New York, where he established a baseball school in 1993.

In a three-season major league career, Lancellotti was a .169 hitter with two home runs and 11 RBI in 36 games. He belted 276 home runs in his minor league career, setting a mark that still stands to this day.

Lancellotti gained induction into the Buffalo Baseball Hall of Fame in August 1995.

Lancellotti's daughter, Katie Lancellotti, played NCAA Division I softball at Canisius College from 2009 to 2012.

References

External links

Rick Lancellotti at SABR (Baseball BioProject)
 Life in the Minors: No Fame or Fortune, Only Diamonds in seven countries

1956 births
Living people
Águilas de Mexicali players
Amarillo Gold Sox players
American expatriate baseball players in Japan
American people of Italian descent
Baseball players from New Jersey
Baseball players from Providence, Rhode Island
Boston Red Sox players
Buffalo Bisons (minor league) players
Cardenales de Lara players
American expatriate baseball players in Venezuela
Charleston Patriots players
Cherry Hill High School East alumni
Erie Kats baseball coaches
Hawaii Islanders players
Hiroshima Toyo Carp players
Las Vegas Stars (baseball) players
Major League Baseball first basemen
Major League Baseball outfielders
Oklahoma City 89ers players
Parma Baseball Club players
Pawtucket Red Sox players
People from Cherry Hill, New Jersey
People from Concord, New Hampshire
Phoenix Firebirds players
Phoenix Giants players
Portland Beavers players
Salem Pirates players
San Diego Padres players
San Francisco Giants players
Sportspeople from Camden County, New Jersey
Sportspeople from Providence, Rhode Island
Sun City Rays players
Rowan Profs baseball players
Tidewater Tides players
Tomateros de Culiacán players
American expatriate baseball players in Mexico
Wichita Aeros players